Brian Stafford is an Irish former Gaelic footballer. He played for the Meath county team in the 1980s and early 1990s under the management of Sean Boylan. For Meath he usually played at full forward. He played club football for Kilmainhamwood. During his playing career he won two Senior All Ireland  medals (1987 & 1988) as well as five Leinster Senior Medals and three National League Medals. He won three All Star awards also. In 1987 he was chosen as the Texaco Footballer of the Year. When playing for Meath he was part of a full forward line of Colm O'Rourke, himself and Bernard Flynn.

Stafford is his county's top scorer in National Football League history, finishing his career with 13–334 (373) in that competition.

References

 https://www.balls.ie/gaa/hardest-men-gaa-149108

External links
 Official Meath Website

1964 births
Living people
Gaelic football forwards
Irish salespeople
Kilmainhamwood Gaelic footballers
Meath inter-county Gaelic footballers
Texaco Footballers of the Year
Winners of two All-Ireland medals (Gaelic football)